Gerard Tom-Tam (born 17 July 1951) is a Cameroonian judoka. He competed in the men's half-lightweight event at the 1980 Summer Olympics.

References

1951 births
Living people
Cameroonian male judoka
Olympic judoka of Cameroon
Judoka at the 1980 Summer Olympics
Place of birth missing (living people)